Nesam Gam (also Romanized as Nesām Gām) is a village in Goli Jan Rural District, in the Central District of Tonekabon County, Mazandaran Province, Iran. At the 2006 census, its population was 22, in 6 families.

References 

Populated places in Tonekabon County